Toronto Union Station may refer to:

 Union Station (Toronto), a major intermodal transit hub in Toronto, Ontario, Canada
 Toronto Union Station (1858), Toronto's first Union Station
 Toronto Union Station (1873), Toronto's second Union Station
 Union station (TTC), a Toronto subway station adjacent to the current Union Station

See also
Union Station Bus Terminal
Union station, explaining the generic term
Union Station (disambiguation)